

Flora

"Algae"

Plants

Fungi

Mycological research

General floral research

Cnidarians

New cnidarian taxa

Cnidarian research
 Redescription of Conicula striata is published by Zhao et al. (2023), who report that C. striata had features of both anthozoans and medusozoan polyps, and recover it as a stem-medusozoan, potentially indicating that medusozoans had an anemone-like ancestor.
 Plotnick, Young & Hagadorn (2023) classify Essexella asherae as a sea anemone, and reinterpret Reticulomedusa greenei as the pedal or oral disc of E. asherae.

Arthropods

Bryozoans

New bryozoan taxa

Bryozoan research
 Yang et al. (2023) reinterpret putative Cambrian bryozoan Protomelission as an early dasycladalean green alga, and conclude that there are no unequivocal bryozoans of Cambrian age.

Brachiopods

New brachiopod taxa

Brachiopod research

Molluscs

Echinoderms

New echinoderm taxa

Echinoderm research
 Thuy et al. (2023) report the discovery of an assemblage of brittle star microfossils from Carboniferous deep-water sediments of Oklahoma (United States), including fossils of basal representatives of Amphilepidida and Ophioscolecida, and interpret this finding as indicating that a significant part of the early diversification of the brittle star crown group might have taken place in deep-water settings.

Hemichordates

Conodonts

New conodont taxa

Conodont research
 A study on the diversity and biostratigraphy of late Norian conodont faunas from the Dashuitang and Nanshuba formations in the Baoshan area (Yunnan, China) is published by Zeng et al. (2023), who report evidence of a decline of conodont diversity during the late Norian, interpreted by the authors as the first crisis of the protracted suite of end-Triassic conodont extinctions.

Fish

Amphibians

New amphibian taxa

Amphibian research
 A study comparing the probable maximum sizes that could be reached by specimens belonging to the Early Triassic temnospondyl taxa from Eastern Europe is published by Morkovin (2023), who reports the discovery of an unusually large lower jaw of Vladlenosaurus alexeyevi from the Skoba locality (Komi Republic, Russia), and argues that the size differences characteristic of the standard adult states of the studied temnospondyl taxa were likely reduced in individuals belonging to very late age categories.
 A study on the histology of large temnospondyl humeri from the Late Triassic Krasiejów site (Poland) is published by Teschner et al. (2023), who report that the humeri of Cyclotosaurus intermedius and Metoposaurus krasiejowensis might show only minor differences in morphology, making histology a valuable tool for taxonomic assignment.
 Review of the fossil record of the genus Mioproteus in Southeastern Europe is published by Syromyatnikova (2023).
 Bazzana-Adams et al. (2023) reconstruct the first virtual cranial endocast of Seymouria.

Reptiles

Synapsids

Non-mammalian synapsids

New synapsid taxa

Synapsid research
 Calábková et al. (2023) describe tracks assignable to the ichnogenus Dimetropus and produced by "pelycosaur"-grade synapsids from the Permian (Asselian) Padochov and Letovice formations (Boskovice Basin, Czech Republic), including a specimen with preserved skin impressions, and providing new information on the diversity of the earliest Permian equatorial tetrapod faunas.
 Maho, Bevitt & Reisz (2023) describe fossil material of Varanops brevirostris from the Dolese Brother Limestone Quarry (Oklahoma, United States), confirming the presence of this taxon at Richards Spur, and interpret this finding as indicating that, although less abundant than Cacops and Acheloma, V. brevirostris was not as rare taxon as previously thought.
 Gônet et al. (2023) present a model which can be used to determine posture from humeral parameters in extant mammals, and use it to infer a sprawling posture for Dimetrodon natalis.
 Partial humerus of a synapsid of uncertain affinities, with anatomical traits blurring the distinction between the "pelycosaur"-grade synapsids and therapsids, is described from the Permian (Capitanian) Main Karoo Basin (South Africa) by Bishop et al. (2023).
 Redescription of the holotype of Nythosaurus larvatus is published by Pusch et al. (2023), who interpret N. larvatus as a taxon distinct from Thrinaxodon liorhinus.
 Stefanello et al. (2023) describe a new, complete and exceptionally well-preserved skull of Prozostrodon brasiliensis from the Upper Triassic strata in Brazil, a name a new endemic clade of South American cynodonts – Prozostrodontidae, including Prozostrodon and Pseudotherium.

Mammals

Other animals

Other new animal taxa

Other animal research
 A study aiming to test the hypothesized feeding modes of Pectinifrons abyssalis is published by Darroch et al. (2023), who interpret their findings as supporting neither a suspension feeding or osmotrophic feeding habit, and indicating that rangeomorph fronds were organs adapted for oxygen uptake and gas exchange, rather than feeding.
 Purported fossil material of Dickinsonia reported from the Bhimbetka rock shelters in rocks of the Maihar Sandstone (India) is reinterpreted as an impression resulting from decay of a modern beehive by Meert et al. (2023).
 A study aiming to assess the validity of species distinctions in the genus Dickinsonia is published by Evans et al. (2023), who interpret their findings as indicative of the presence of two distinct species from South Australia, D. costata and D. tenuis.
 New information on the body plan of Dickinsonia, based on data from the fossil material from the southeastern White Sea area (Russia), is presented by Ivantsov & Zakrevskaya (2023), who interpret the anatomy of Dickinsonia as indicative of its affinity to the urbilaterian.
 Wu, Pisani & Donoghue (2023) study the interrelationship between main groups of Panarthropoda, attempting to determine whether morphological datasets from the studies of extant and fossil panarthropod relationships published by Legg, Sutton & Edgecombe (2013), Yang et al. (2016) and Aria, Zhao & Zhu (2021) can discriminate statistically between competing Tactopoda, Lobopodia and Protarthopoda hypotheses, and question the accuracy of morphology-based phylogenies of Panarthropoda that include fossil species.

Other organisms

Other new organisms

Other organism research
 A study on the Cretaceous benthic foraminiferal assemblages from the Western Interior Seaway is published by Bryant, Meehan & Belanger (2023), who find no genera, guilds or morphotypes unique to cold seeps, and find assemblages from cold seeps to be overall more similar to offshore assemblages than nearshore ones, but also report that the composition of the studied assemblages did reflect the environmental differences present at seeps.
 A study on the fossil record of the planktonic foraminifera, interpreted as indicating that a modern-style latitudinal diversity gradient for these foraminifera arose only 15 million years ago, is published by Fenton et al. (2023).
 A study on the geographical distribution of the ecological and morphological groups of fossil planktonic foraminifera, interpreted as indicative of a global shift towards the Equator over the past 8 million years in response to the late Cenozoic temperature changes related to the polar ice sheet formation, is published by Woodhouse et al. (2023).
 Fonseca et al. (2023) describe possible fossil material of choanoflagellates from the Upper Cretaceous (Cenomanian–Turonian) Capas Blancas Formation (Spain), representing the first putative occurrence of choanoflagellates in the fossil record reported to date.

History of life in general
 Li et al. (2023) compare the lamello-fibrillar nacre and similar fibrous microstructures in Early Cambrian molluscs and hyoliths from the Zavkhan Basin (Mongolia) and in extant coleoid cuttlebones and serpulid tubes, report differences in shell microstructures of the studied lophotrochozoan groups, and interpret their findings as indicative of prevalence of calcitic shells in the Terreneuvian.
 A study aiming to identify the biases affecting the knowledge of the biodiversity during the Cambrian and Ordovician is published by Du et al. (2023), who interpret the significant decline in known biodiversity during Furongian interval as influenced by temporal, geographic, taxonomic and lithological biases, hindering the understanding of the real biodiversity changes in this interval.
 A study on the impact of the Permian–Triassic extinction event on the marine ecosystems is published by Huang et al. (2023), who find that the first extinction phase resulted in the loss of more than half of taxonomic diversity but only a slight decrease of community stability, which subsequently decreased significantly in the second extinction phase.
 Dai et al. (2023) report the discovery of an exceptionally preserved Early Triassic (approximately 250.8 million years ago) fossil assemblage (the Guiyang biota) from the Daye Formation near Guiyang (China), providing evidence of the existence of a complex marine ecosystem shortly after the Permian–Triassic extinction event.
 A study on the timing of Pleistocene megafaunal extinction in the high plains of Peru is published by Rozas-Davila, Rodbell & Bush (2023), who find that the collapse of megafaunal populations in high grasslands coincided with upticks in fire activity, which were likely associated with human activity.

Other research
 A study on the stratigraphy of the Siberian Platform (Russia), and on its implications for the knowledge of the age of the fossils and timing of first appearances of late Ediacaran and early Cambrian organisms from the Siberian Platform (including anabaritids and cloudinids), is published by Bowyer et al. (2023).
 Nolan et al. (2023) interpret Brooksella alternata as a likely pseudofossil, and the bulk of its characteristics as consistent with concretions.
 Evidence from mercury concentrations and isotopes from terrestrial sections from the Sydney Basin (Australia) and Karoo Basin (South Africa), interpreted as indicative of global volcanic effects of the Siberian Traps during the Permian-Triassic transition, is presented by Shen et al. (2023).
 Evidence from concentrations of UV-B–absorbing compounds in the exine of fossil pollen from the Qubu section in southern Tibet (China), interpreted as consistent with increased UV-B radiation during the Permian–Triassic extinction event, is presented by Liu et al. (2023).
 A study on the Cenomanian–Turonian benthic foraminiferal assemblages from the Western Interior Seaway is published by Bryant & Belanger (2023), who report that the interval of increased density and diversity of benthic foraminifera known as the Benthonic Zone is not a reliable biostratigraphic marker for the onset of the Oceanic Anoxic Event 2 in the Western Interior Seaway, and that different samples of the Benthonic Zone don't reflect basin-wide changes in oxygenation.
 Evidence from two sites offshore of southwest Australia, interpreted as indicative of ocean acidification at the onset of Oceanic Anoxic Event 2 which was linked to the onset of volcanic activity, and which persisted for approximately 600,000 years due to biogeochemical feedbacks, is presented by Jones et al. (2023).
 A study on the history of the Eocene waterbody within the Giraffe Pipe crater (Northwest Territories, Canada), inferred from changes in the fossil record of microorganisms, is published by Siver & Lott (2023), who interpret their findings as indicative of the presence of a series of successive shallow environments, each correlated with changes in lakewater chemistry.

Paleoclimate
 Evidence from seawater osmium isotope data from Pacific Ocean sediments, interpreted as indicating that enhanced magmatism could have played a dominant role in causing the Miocene Climatic Optimum, is presented by Goto et al. (2023).
 Wen et al. (2023) present a new land surface temperature record from the Chinese Loess Plateau in East Asia, interpreting it as indicative of late Miocene cooling and aridification that occurred synchronously with ocean cooling, highlighting a global climate forcing mechanism.

References